Paul Kane (born March 23, 1950) is an American poet, critic and scholar. Awards for his work include Fellowships from the National Endowment for the Humanities, the Guggenheim Foundation, the Bogliasco Foundation, a Fulbright Award, and an honorary doctorate from La Trobe University in Australia. He is also considered an Australian poet. Kane teaches at Vassar College and lives in Warwick, New York.

Life
Kane was born in a small village in upstate New York and has lived most of his life in the country.  Residing in Warwick, NY, since 1974, he also spends time each year in rural Australia, where he built himself a house as a retreat.  He finished high school at The Hill School in Pottstown, PA, where he met visiting poet W. H. Auden, and afterwards spent a year at St. Peter's School in York, England, on an English-Speaking Union Fellowship.  He subsequently attended Yale University, where he was active in the student movement. After college, he began studying at the Chardavogne Barn, under the tutelage of W. A. Nyland.  He spent a decade working various jobs, including teaching, carpentry, landscaping, rug repair and bookselling. Kane received a Fulbright award to the University of Melbourne in 1984 to write a study of Australian poetry. He then spent a year as the Schweitzer Prize Preceptor in Poetics at New York University before returning to Yale in 1986, where he completed a doctorate.  Since 1990, he has worked as a professor at Vassar College.

Career
As an undergraduate at Yale (1969–73) Kane worked with poets Mark Strand, Richard Howard, and Jean Valentine and studied literature with Cleanth Brooks and Harold Bloom.  He also met Robert Penn Warren, Elizabeth Bishop, Robert Lowell and Allen Ginsburg (who visited during the student strike in 1970). After college Kane began publishing poems in journals, including Poetry, The New American Review, The Paris Review, The New Republic, The Kenyon Review and Grand Street.  After the Fulbright year in Australia, where he befriended poets Vincent Buckley, Chris Wallace-Crabbe, Gwen Harwood, Kevin Hart, Philip Hodgins and Les Murray, he worked with John Hollander, Harold Bloom and Geoffrey Hartman at the Yale Graduate School.  He taught briefly at Yale before going on to Vassar College.  During that time, his first book of poems was published by George Braziller in New York, The Farther Shore (1989), which Nobel Laureate Joseph Brodsky described as "a dark echo of Robert Frost."

In 1994, Kane co-edited the Library of America edition of Ralph Waldo Emerson: Collected Poems and Translations, and brought out the following year, Poetry of the American Renaissance: A Diverse Anthology from the Romantic Period (1995, rev. 2012).  This was followed by his ground-breaking Australian Poetry: Romanticism and Negativity (1996), hailed as "magnificent"  and praised for its "theoretical reach and elegance."

Kane's second book of poems, Drowned Lands (2000), continued the personal and historical themes explored in his earlier collection. Harold Bloom praised Kane for adding to "the Virgilian elegance of The Farther Shore a quality of quizzical wisdom."  Kane's next major collection, Work Life (2007), extended his range (John Koethe thought it "imbued with the magic of the matter-of-fact") and touched on the collective trauma of 9/11, as in the poem "The Knowing".

In 2011, a collection of his poems was translated into Chinese as The Scholar's Rock, and, in 2013, Kane collaborated with the Irish sound artist Katie O'Looney to make Seven Catastrophes in Four Movements (Farpoint Recordings).

As a scholar of American literature, Kane writes primarily on the work of the Transcendentalists, particularly Ralph Waldo Emerson, but he also focuses on contemporary poetry and criticism.  His interest in environmental literature can be seen in his Rothko Chapel talk, published as "Inner Landscapes as Sacred Landscapes" in The Kenyon Review (2003).

Kane's involvement with Australian literature has grown steadily over the years.  A founding member of the American Association of Australasian Literary Studies in 1986, and President from 1991-96, he has been Poetry Editor of its journal Antipodes since its inception.  In 1995 he attended the inaugural Mildura Writers Festival in Australia and subsequently became Artistic Director.  In 2012, as General Editor, he initiated The Braziller Series of Australian Poets to introduce contemporary Australian poets to American readers.  Nobel laureate J. M. Coetzee, writing in The New York Review of Books, called Kane's Australian Poetry "the best study we have of poetry in Australia."  In 2013, Kane received an honorary degree from La Trobe University for his contribution to Australia's cultural life.

Kane is included in a volume of interviews of writers and intellectuals by Cassandra Atherton, In So Many Words (2013), which also features Noam Chomsky, Howard Zinn, Camille Paglia and Harold Bloom.

Reviews
"Kane's big third collection presents poems as well crafted as any these days, as well as a wonderfully appealing persona. His poetic voice is modest, reporting ruminatively rather than solipsistically within the flow of personal experience. There's no missing his intelligence—or his cultivation. 'Psyche,' the long poem at this book's center, attests to his strengths rather magnificently....Perhaps Coleridge, were he with us now, would write such a poem."

"The special paradox of Kane's achievement is to have crafted a form of address as deceptively open as Walt Whitman's, while being as edgy and as spiritually cryptic as Emily Dickinson."

"There are so many influences and traditions underpinning this work, yet it speaks to a reader with simplicity and clarity, so that one comes not merely to enjoy, but to value its irony and its philosophical refinement."

Bibliography

Poetry
Collections
1989  The Farther Shore. George Braziller
2000  Drowned Lands. University of South Carolina Press
2006  Psyche: A Poem.  Warwick Publications
2007  Work Life: New Poems.  Turtle Point Press
2008  A Slant of Light.  Whitmore Press (Australia)
2011  The Scholar's Rock, trans. Shaoyang & Renlan Zhang. Otherland (Australia)
2014  Hafiz: Twelve Ghazals, illus. Tina Kane. Warwick Publications
2016  Welcome Light. Audubon Terrace Press
2017  Renga: 100 Poems, with John Kinsella. GloriaSMH Press (Australia)
2018  A Passing Bell: Ghazals for Tina. White Crane Press (Australia)

List of poems

Non-fiction
1994  Ralph Waldo Emerson: Collected Poems & Translations.  Harold Bloom & Paul Kane, eds., The Library of America
1996  Australian Poetry: Romanticism and Negativity. Cambridge UP
1996  Ralph Waldo Emerson: Essays and Poems. Harold Bloom & Paul Kane, eds., Library of America
2004  Vintage. Donata Carrazza & Paul Kane, eds., Hardie Grant Books
2005  Letters to Les. Donata Carrazza & Paul Kane, eds. Sunnyland Press
2012  Poetry of the American Renaissance. George Braziller

Collaborations
1994  Tears For Columbia, music by Chet Kane, Glitterhouse Records
2007  Work Life: New Poems.  Turtle Point Press
2012  Mont St. Michel and Shiprock, photographs by William Clift, Peramain Press
2013  Seven Catastrophes in Four Movements, music by Katie O'Looney. Farpoint Recordings

Awards and honors
Over the course of his career, Paul Kane has won a variety of awards for poetry and teaching. While he was a student at Yale, he won the university's McLaughlin English Prize in 1970, and in 1973, he was appointed Class Poet. In 1984, he won a Fulbright Post-Graduate Grant, and in 1985, the Schweitzer Prize Preceptorship in Poetics from New York University. The following year, he was awarded Yale University's university fellowship. In 1987, he received a Literature Board Project Grant from the Australia Council, and in 1990, he was elected to PEN America. In 1989, Kane was an Expert-in-Residence at Hamilton College in Australia and a Guest Fellow at Ezra Stiles college at his alma mater, Yale University. In 1998, he was awarded both an NEH Fellowship from the National Endowment for the Humanities and a Guggenheim Fellowship from the John Simon Guggenheim Memorial Foundation. In 2000, Paul Kane was a visiting scholar at Monash University in Australia. In 2007, he was awarded the Philip Hodgins Memorial Medal for Service in Mildura, Australia. In 2012, he received an Initiative Grant Literature Board of the Australia Council for the Arts and was an artist-in-residence at The Guesthouse Arts Collective in Cork, Ireland. In 2012, Kane was also appointed as Poet Laureate of Orange County, New York. In 2013, The Liguria Study Center in Bogliasco, Italy awarded Kane with its Bogliasco Fellowship. In 2013, Paul Kane was awarded an Honorary Doctorate (honoris causa) from La Trobe University in Melbourne, Australia.

References

External links
Paul Kane, Tapa Notebook
Ali Alizadeh Interviews Paul Kane
Paul Kane, Vassar College
"Poems" in Verse

1950 births
Living people
Australian poetry
Members of the American Academy of Arts and Letters
Yale University alumni
20th-century American poets
21st-century American poets
20th-century American translators
21st-century American translators
Quadrant (magazine) people
People from Cobleskill, New York